Baboquivari Unified School District (BUSD) is a school district with its headquarters in Sells, a census-designated place in unincorporated Pima County, Arizona. The school district was known as the Indian Oasis-Baboquivari Unified School District (IOBUSD) until 2012.

History

 it had almost 1,100 students. Its starting salary for teachers was $51,000. According to superintendent Edna Morris, some houses had no running water or electricity.

Schools
Schools include:

Traditional:
 Baboquivari Middle & High School (Topawa CDP)
 Indian Oasis Elementary Intermediate School (Sells CDP)
 Indian Oasis Elementary Primary School (Sells CDP)

Alternative secondary:
 Indian Oasis Middle School and High School (Sells CDP) – Alternative school

Previously the school organization was different, with Baboquivari High School in Topawa, Indian Oasis Elementary School in Sells, and Baboquivari Middle School, Indian Oasis Middle School, and Indian Oasis High School sharing the same Sells campus.

See also
 Tohono O'odham High School, Bureau of Indian Affairs-operated high school near Sells

References

External links
 Baboquivari Unified School District
 

School districts in Pima County, Arizona